is a Japanese actor and voice actor from Tokyo attached to Theatre Company Subaru.

Biography

Filmography

Anime

Film

Video games

Drama CDs

Tokusatsu

Dubbing roles

Stage
 Flowers for Algernon (1990) (Matt Gordon)

References

External links
Official agency profile 

1950 births
Living people
Japanese male video game actors
Japanese male voice actors
Male voice actors from Tokyo
20th-century Japanese male actors
21st-century Japanese male actors